NA-17 Abbottabad-II is a constituency for the National Assembly of Pakistan. The constituency was formerly known as NA-18 (Abbottabad-II) from 1977 to 2018. The name changed to NA-15 (Abbottabad-I) after the delimitation in 2018 and to NA-17 (Abbottabad-II) after the delimitation in 2022.

Members of Parliament

1977–2002: NA-18 Abbottabad-II

2002–2018: NA-18 Abbottabad-II

2018-2022: NA-15 Abbottabad-I

Elections since 2002

2002 general election

A total of 3,200 votes were rejected.

2008 general election

A total of 3,843 votes were rejected.

2013 general election

A total of 6,784 votes were rejected.

2018 general election 

General elections were held on 25 July 2018.

See also
NA-16 Abbottabad-I
NA-18 Haripur

References

External links 
 Election result's official website

15
15